Cinemanovels is a 2013 Canadian comedy film written and directed by Terry Miles. It was screened in the Contemporary World Cinema section at the 2013 Toronto International Film Festival. The film holds the record for Canada's second lowest opening weekend box office gross of 2013, earning just $298, opening to just a dozen theatres.

Plot
Grace (Lauren Lee Smith) is living the spoiled inheritance lifestyle of her famous late Quebecois film director father in the swanky Gastown district of Vancouver albeit extremely bored and dissatisfied with her life. By chance, she is approached by film student Adam (Kett Turton) of her loft building who is extremely influenced by her father's cinematic works. She permits him access to remaster and release her father's cinematic archives for professor lectures, and begins a relationship with him, granting him sexual favors in gratitude for reviving her career, even though she already has her husband, Ben (Ben Cotton). Her friend Clementine (Jennifer Beals), has a secret criminally inclined double life and this eventually intertwines with Grace's double life as well.

Cast
 Lauren Lee Smith as Grace
 Jennifer Beals as Clementine
 Ben Cotton as Ben
 Kett Turton as Adam
 Katharine Isabelle as Charlotte
 Sarah Grey as Julia

Production
Cinemanovels was directed and written by Terry Miles, and produced by Kristine Cofsky, Terry Miles, Lauren Lee Smith. Principal photography primarily takes place in the Gastown neighbourhood in Vancouver, British Columbia.

Reception
The film has a user rating of 5.3 due to mixed critic reviews on IMDb.

References

External links

 

2013 films
2013 comedy films
Canadian comedy films
English-language Canadian films
2010s English-language films
2010s Canadian films